Perry Ellis International is an American clothing, fashion, cosmetics and beauty company that includes a portfolio of brands distributed through multiple channels worldwide. The company focuses primarily on sportswear and casual clothing for niche markets. It is headquartered in Doral, Florida, United States.

History 

Perry Ellis International was founded by George Feldenkreis. Feldenkreis was Born in Havana, Cuba and his parents were Russian immigrants. After moving to Miami in 1961, he founded Supreme International.  Throughout the 1970's Supreme went international and began selling through mass retailers J.C. Penney and Sears. In 1979 Feldenkreis's son, Oscar Feldenkreis, joined as vice president and a board director. In 1993, Supreme International goes public on NASDAQ stock exchange under the symbol SUPI.  SUPI recorded $33M in revenues that previous year. In 1999 Supreme International acquired Perry Ellis and changed its parent company name to Perry Ellis International with the stock ticker PERY. Throughout the 2000's Perry acquired numerous brands and several major Golf brands. Perry now has several major dot com Golf brands and is the licensee for the PGA Tour. Oscar Feldenkreis becomes CEO and President in 2016. During the COVID-19 pandemic, Perry launched Perry Health with First Responders Children's Foundation, In 2022 Perry Ellis executive held a panel at the Miami Retail Summit with AI expert Blake Van Leer to discuss innovating online initiatives. Later that year the brand partnered with delivery apps to increase speed, convenience and security for their customers.

PEI Brands 
Anchor Blue
Axis
Axist
Ben Hogan
C&C California
Café Luna Collection
Callaway (licensed)
Centro
Chispa
Cubavera
Farah
Girl Star
Gotcha
Grand Slam
Havanera
Jag
Jantzen
John Henry
Laundry by Shelli Segal
Manhattan
MCD
Miller's Outpost
Mondo di Marco
Munsingwear
Natural Issue
Nike Swim (licensed)
Original Khaki Company
Original Penguin
Perry Ellis
PGA Champions
PGA Tour
Pro Player
Rafaella
Redsand
SAVANE
Solero
Tahoe River Outfitters
Tricots St. Raphael

Current Licenses 

July 1, 2005: Weeplay LLC will extend the popular Original Penguin brand to newborn, infant, and toddler sizes.

July 21, 2005: Lupo International for the manufacture and distribution in the United States and Canada of Mondo di Marco men's dress and casual shoes.

July 22, 2005: South Pacific Apparel Pty Ltd. for the manufacture and distribution of Savane and Farah men's and boy's dress and casual trousers and shorts in Australia, New Zealand, and other South Pacific islands. On this day, PEI also went into agreement with Cardinal Clothing Canada, Inc. for the manufacture and domestic distribution of Perry Ellis and Perry Ellis Portfolio men's topcoats.

April 2006: Levi Straus & Co. for the manufacture and distribution of Dockers men's cloth outerwear in the United States and Mexico.

May 22, 2006: JAG Licensing LLC entered into a license agreement to manufacture and distribute JAG men's and women's swimwear and cover-ups in the United States, Canada and Mexico.

January 2007: Falic Fashion Group, LLC, a wholly-owned subsidiary of Duty-Free Americas, Inc. As part of the transaction, Falic Fashion Group agreed to purchase all rights, titles, interests, certain intangible assets, and inventory of the fragrance business in a cash transaction of approximately $63 million.

Executives 

George Feldenkreis: chairman of the board and CEO
Oscar Feldenkreis: Vice-chairman, President, and COO

See also

 Fashion in the United States
 Perry Ellis
 Perry Ellis (brand)

Notes

References 

 
Clothing brands of the United States
Underwear brands
American companies established in 1967
Clothing companies established in 1967
Design companies established in 1967
Companies based in Doral, Florida
Companies formerly listed on the Nasdaq
1993 initial public offerings
2018 mergers and acquisitions